The episode list for the ABC series Spin City.

In total, there are 145 episodes, with Michael J. Fox starring in the first 100 episodes, and Charlie Sheen starring in the last 45.

Series overview

Episodes

Season 1 (1996–97)

Season 2 (1997–98)

Season 3 (1998–99)

Season 4 (1999–2000)

Season 5 (2000–01)

Season 6 (2001–02)

Notes

References

External links 
 
 List of Spin City Episodes on the TV Guide website

Spin City
Spin City